The Spi-1 (PU.1) 5′ UTR regulatory element is an RNA element found in the 5′ UTR of Spi-1 mRNA which is able to inhibit the translation Spi-1 transcripts by 8-fold. Spi-1 regulates myeloid gene expression during haemopoietic development.  Mutations in this regulatory region of the 5′ UTR can lead to overexpression of Spi-1 which has been linked to development of leukaemia.

See also 
InvR

References

External links 
 

Cis-regulatory RNA elements